This is a list of Danish television related events from 1960.

Events
6 February - Katy Bødtger is selected to represent Denmark at the 1960 Eurovision Song Contest with her song "Det var en yndig tid". She is selected to be the fourth Danish Eurovision entry during Dansk Melodi Grand Prix held at the Radiohouse in Copenhagen.

Debuts

Television shows

Ending this year

Births
23 March - Allan Olsen, actor
21 May - Pernille Højmark, singer & actress
11 October - Michael Carøe, singer, comedian & TV host
8 December - Anders Frandsen, singer, actor & TV host

Deaths

See also
 1960 in Denmark